Ayuko (written:  or ) is a feminine Japanese given name. Notable people with the name include:

, Japanese shōjo manga artist
, Japanese short track speed skater
, Japanese politician
, Japanese long-distance runner

Fictional characters
, a character in the manga series Mysterious Girlfriend X
, a character in the manga series Aiura

Japanese feminine given names